Brink is an unincorporated community in Marion and Wetzel counties, West Virginia, United States.

References

Unincorporated communities in Marion County, West Virginia
Unincorporated communities in Wetzel County, West Virginia
Unincorporated communities in West Virginia